Horama tarsalis is a moth of the subfamily Arctiinae. It was described by Francis Walker in 1856. It is found on Haiti.

References

 

Euchromiina
Moths described in 1856